His Father's Portrait is a 1953 French comedy film starring Brigitte Bardot.

The film recorded 1,643,820 admissions.

Cast

 Jean Richard as Paul 
 Michèle Philippe as Marie 
 Brigitte Bardot as Domino 
 Mona Goya as Paul's mother
 Frédéric Duvallès as Le directeur
 Maurice Biraud as Didier
 Charles Bouillaud as Martin 
 Philippe Mareuil as Michel
 Robert Rollis as Ferdinand
 Mona Dol as Domino's mother 
 Max Elloy as 
 Paul Faivre as Le notaire
 Roger Pierre as Le présentateur (uncredited)

Production
The music of the songs C'est si bon (1947) and Maître Pierre (1948) are used in the film. They were composed by Henri Betti and are his two biggest hits.

The song Le Beau Pedro performed by Armand Mestral was written by Henri Betti (music) and Jean Nohain (lyrics) for the film Soyez les bienvenus directed by Pierre-Louis the same year.

References

External links

1953 films
Films directed by André Berthomieu
French comedy films
French black-and-white films
1953 comedy films
1950s French-language films
1950s French films